Galactik Football is a seventy-eight episode animated children's television series about a futuristic football team, co-produced by Alphanim and France 2 for Jetix Europe. The series comprised three seasons, and ran from 2006 to 2011

Episodes

Season 1

Season 2

Season 3

References

Lists of French animated television series episodes